The 2007 BigPond 400 is the second round of the 2007 V8 Supercar season. It was held on the weekend of the 23rd to 25 March at Barbagallo Raceway in Wanneroo, north of Perth, Western Australia. The round was significant in that John Bowe became the driver with the most round starts in the championship after passing Peter Brock. It was also significant in that it was Paul Radisich's first round after a major crash at Bathurst in 2006.

Qualifying 
Qualifying was held on Saturday 25 March 2007.

Part 1
Qualifying started with 30 cars hitting the track instead of the usual 31 after a major accident between Jason Bright and Jason Richards after Bright had an engine failure going through turn 4. He (Bright) pulled towards the short cut to go off the track across the path of Jason Richards. The damage to the Fujitsu Racing car was very extensive, so severe that Bright had to withdraw from the entire round.

Paul Dumbrell was one of ten drivers which did not make the top twenty due to a linkage breaking off the throttle pedal. Jamie Whincup also had a spin into the gravel trap at turn 6 which prompted the session to be red flagged. Whincup was able to recover to make the next part of qualifying. Other drivers who went off the circuit included Max Wilson and James Courtney.

Part 2
Session 2 saw Garth Tander set the fastest lap of the session and then sat out for most of the remaining session. The other drivers which were fast in this session were Rick Kelly, Mark Skaife and Todd Kelly. Max Wilson also had another off in this session when he ran wide at turn 7 and through the sand trap.

Part 3
The final session saw the top ten drivers fight for pole. The session was relatively quiet, however Jamie Whincup went off the track in turn 1 by locking the rear tyres and Will Davison ran off the track at turn four. The final results from qualifying was Garth Tander took pole, from Rick Kelly in second and Craig Lowndes in third.

Race 1
Race 1 was held on Saturday 25 March 2007. It started with a relatively smooth start for the first lap, how this did not last long with Cameron McConville tagging John Bowe in turn 4, causing Bowe to go off the track. Over the next couple of laps, Mark Skaife and Craig Lowndes had a major battle over 3rd place, with both drivers changing positions a number of times.

Garth Tander continued to lead the race, until he took his compulsory pit stop on lap 22, allowing his team mate Rick Kelly to take first place. However Rick pitted on the next lap.

After all of the compulsory pit stops were done, Tander came out in first, with Rick Kelly in second and Skaife in third. Todd Kelly and Craig Lowndes continued to battle over fourth position, until on lap 38 when Todd Kelly ran off the track at the first corner and bogged the car in the sand trap. This caused the first safety car of the race. Todd Kelly communicated to the team after the incident that "the brakes had let go, and there was brake fluid throughout the cabin."

With three laps to go, Max Wilson collided with John Bowe causing Bowe to get beached at corner 7. This didn’t cause a safety car due to the closeness of the end of the race, but rather a localised yellow flag. The race was won by Toll HSV Dealer Team’s Garth Tander with his team mate Rick Kelly second, and HRT’s Mark Skaife in third.

Race 2 
Race 2 was held on Sunday 26 March 2007. Off the start line, Craig Lowndes was able to get past 3rd place Mark Skaife and raced behind Garth Tander and Rick Kelly. However, on lap 9 Skaife was able to retake 3rd by overtaking Lowndes at turn 6. Lowndes struggled with tyres for the next few laps and pitted as soon as the pit stop window opened.

On lap 21, Cameron McConville was turned around by Steven Richards at the first corner after leaving the pitlane. Team Vodafones’s Jamie Whincup was given a drive through penalty for speeding in the pit lane after not turning on his pit speed limiter. Brad Jones also had a minor off at turn 7 during the second half of the race.

On lap 44, Steve Owen ran off the track at turn 4 after contact with Steven Richards and then crashed into the tyre barriers at turn 7 on the same lap after stating on the radio that he had no brakes. This prompted the first safety car of the race. James Courtney also had engine troubles and retired from the race on the same lap.

Following the restart, Tander went on to win the race, with Rick Kelly in second and Skaife in third.

Race 3
Race 3 was held on Sunday 26 March 2007. The race saw a close fight between both Toll HSV Dealer Team cars and Mark Skaife. The race saw James Courtney have a large crash after steering failure going through the turn 3 complex of the track. This caused his retirement on the 28th lap.

Overall Garth Tander won the race from his team mate Rick Kelly with Mark Skaife in third. This gave Tander not only the round win, but also the clean sweep of taking pole position as well as all three race wins.

Results

Qualifying

Race 1 results

Race 2 results

Race 3 results

In-Car Camera Coverage
The six cars carrying cameras at this round were those of Rick Kelly, Mark Skaife, Russell Ingall, Jamie Whincup, Max Wilson and Paul Dumbrell.

External links
 BigPond 400 website

Perth V8 400
Perth V8 400
Sport in Perth, Western Australia
Motorsport in Western Australia